The Vail Ski & Snowboard Academy is a public school operated as part of the Eagle County Schools District, in Eagle County, Colorado, United States. It provides students in fifth through twelfth grades with a flexible schedule that allows them to participate in skiing and snowboarding training programs at Vail Ski Resort, making it the first public winter sports academy in the United States.

The academy is operated in conjunction with Ski & Snowboard Club Vail, providing a traditional and flexible academic program while giving student-athletes the opportunity to train and compete at the international and Olympic level. Established in 2007, the academy was developed after years of negotiations between district and club officials, making it the first such public ski and snowboard training academy in the US. As of 2011, the program serves about 200 students at the middle school and high school level, and includes individuals who competed at the 2010 Winter Olympics held in Vancouver, British Columbia, as well as members of the United States Ski Team and a number of elite-level junior competitors. Similar publicly funded winter sports training programs have existed in European countries for years, where they have achieved success in developing Olympic champions.

While the academic program is free for county residents, the ski and snowboard training costs $7,500 per year, a fraction of the $25,000 charged by some of the 20 private programs that combine classroom education with comparable training. Students use laptop computers that allow them to complete coursework and interact with teachers remotely, wherever training or competitive events may take them. The academic year is structured so that students are in classes for a traditional school day during the fall and spring, while during the winter all academic programs are shifted to the afternoon to allow students the opportunity to train in their sport in the morning on school days, as well as all day Saturday and Sunday, with no training (and a full day of classes) on Mondays. The heavier academic load carried by students in the fall and spring allows for a lighter course load during the winter, while students are training and competing. While students who were in traditional public school programs had been forced to miss up to 40 days each school year, VSSA is designed to coordinate with the schedules of the student-athletes in a program described by a school official as "No child left behind on the slopes".

As of the 2014-15 school year, the school had an enrollment of 172 students and 11.5 classroom teachers (on an FTE basis), for a student–teacher ratio of 15.0:1. There were 3 students (1.7% of enrollment) eligible for free lunch and none eligible for reduced-cost lunch.

References

External links

Education in Colorado
Educational institutions established in 2007
Skiing in the United States
Schools in Eagle County, Colorado
Public high schools in Colorado
Public middle schools in Colorado
Skiing in Colorado
2007 establishments in Colorado